Ross Harrison (born 1943) is a British philosopher and academic. He served as Provost of King's College, Cambridge from 2006 to 2013. He was previously Quain Professor of Jurisprudence at University College London. Harrison's books include "Bentham" (RKP, 1983), which explores the philosophy of Jeremy Bentham.

References

 

 

1943 births
Living people
21st-century British philosophers
Academics of the University of Cambridge
Fellows of King's College, Cambridge
Academics of University College London
Provosts of King's College, Cambridge